The list of awards and nominations received by Archie Panjabi includes two NAACP Image Award for Outstanding Supporting Actress in a Drama Series (2011 and 2012), Primetime Emmy Award for  Outstanding Supporting Actress in a Drama Series (2010), Best Actress at the Reims Festival (2005), Shooting Stars Award at the Berlin International Film Festival (2005), Best Actress at the Mons International Love Film Festival (2005), and Chopard Trophy at the 2007 Cannes Film Festival for Female Revelation of the Year.

She was named one of the "Top 10 Faces on TV to Watch" by Variety (2009), one of the "Breakout TV Stars of the Year" by Entertainment Weekly (2010), one of the "Top Young Power Women Under 40" by Verve (2011), one of GG2's Power 101 as Britain's "19th Most Influential and Powerful Asian" (2011), one of the "Best TV Characters of the Year" by MTV (2011), one of the year's "Greatest Scene Stealers" by the New York Post (2011), and celebrated as one of "Eight Master Performers Who Turn Television into Art" by The New York Times Magazine.

Awards and nominations

Berlin International Film Festival Awards

Cannes International Film Festival Awards

Crime Thriller Awards

Critics' Choice Television Awards

Golden Globe Awards

Mons International Love Film Festival Awards

NAACP Image Award

Online Film & Television Association Awards

Primetime Emmy Awards

Reims International Television Days Awards

Satellite Awards

Screen Actors Guild Awards

A  Shared with Christine Baranski, Josh Charles, Matt Czuchry, Julianna Margulies, Graham Phillips and Makenzie Vega.
B  Shared with Baranski, Charles, Alan Cumming, Czuchry, Margulies, Chris Noth and Phillips.
C  Shared with Baranski, Charles, Cumming, Czuchry, Margulies, Noth, Phillips and Vega.
"'D"'   Shared with Margo Martindale

References

External links
 

Panjabi, Archie